The Henkel-Duke Mercantile Company Warehouse, also known as Charles Henkel & Co. Building or Montgomery Ward Warehouse, is a historic warehouse in downtown Pueblo, Colorado.  The building once served as a wholesale grocery warehouse.

See also
Montgomery Ward Building (Pueblo, Colorado), also NRHP-listed

References

Commercial buildings on the National Register of Historic Places in Colorado
Colonial Revival architecture in Colorado
Commercial buildings completed in 1895
Warehouses on the National Register of Historic Places
National Register of Historic Places in Pueblo, Colorado
1895 establishments in Colorado